Wang Xuefeng, may refer to:

 Wang Xuefeng (born 1954), Chinese politician, party secretary of Tangshan, vice chairman of Hebei Provincial People's Congress.

 Wang Xuefeng (born 1966), Chinese politician and diplomat, the current Chinese Ambassador to Botswana, former Chinese Ambassador to Samoa.